Epibaion is a trace fossil imprint of the Ediacaran animals of the phylum Proarticulata, which became extinct in the Precambrian. Imprints often occurring in chains, that is interpreted as a feeding trace; some chains terminate in a body fossil, allowing their maker to be identified. Several specimens are known; E. waggoneris was produced by Yorgia waggoneri; E. costatus by Dickinsonia costata, and E. axiferus, the type species, has as yet not been found with a trace-maker. It is proposed that the Australian fossil Phyllozoon is also a feeding trace of Proarticulata.

See also
 List of Ediacaran genera

References

Proarticulata
Fossil taxa described in 2002